"Navy Blue" is a song written  by Bob Crewe, Bud Rehak and Eddie Rambeau. The song tells the story of a girl who was lonely for her steady boyfriend while he was away from home in the U.S. Navy and could hardly wait to see him again. The song's story is continued in "Kiss Me Sailor."

Recorded in 1963 by pop singer Diane Renay at the age of seventeen and released as a single, "Navy Blue" reached number six on the Billboard Hot 100 and topped the Middle-Road singles chart for one week in March 1964.

Charts

See also
List of number-one adult contemporary singles of 1964 (U.S.)

References

1963 singles
1964 singles
Diane Renay songs
Songs written by Bob Crewe
Song recordings produced by Bob Crewe
1964 songs
20th Century Fox Records singles